Micah Johnson may refer to:
Micah Johnson (baseball) (born 1990), baseball player
Micah Johnson (gridiron football) (born 1988), gridiron football player
Micah Johnson (journalist), broadcast journalist 
Micah Xavier Johnson ( 1991–2016), perpetrator of the 2016 shooting of Dallas police officers